Richard C. Aster is an American seismologist and is Professor of Geophysics and Department Head of Geosciences at Colorado State University.

Aster's research includes seismic imaging, volcano seismology, microseismicity, seismic noise, seismic instrumentation, crustal and mantle seismology, fluvial seismology and cryoseismology.  Dr. Aster served as president of the Seismological Society of America from 2009-2010. and as an elected board member of the society from 2008-2014. In 1999 Aster founded the New Mexico Tech IRIS PASSCAL Instrument Center, which supports diverse seismological studies around the world under the management of the Incorporated Research Institutions for Seismology with primary funding from the National Science Foundation and U.S. Department of Energy, and served as the first Principal Investigator of the facility. Aster Glacier in the Ellsworth Mountains of Antarctica is named for Dr. Aster, who received the NSF Antarctic Services Medal for fieldwork in Antarctica in 1999. Aster was awarded the Distinguished Research Award by New Mexico Tech in 2010 and the university's Faculty Award in 2005.  Aster was featured in the 2011-2012 BBC Horizon production The Core.  Dr. Aster is a member of the Seismological Society of America, the American Geophysical Union, the Geological Society of America, the International Glaciological Society and other Earth science societies and organizations.

Aster, with Brian Borchers of New Mexico Tech and Clifford Thurber of the University of Wisconsin-Madison, is a co-author of an internationally used geophysics/mathematical textbook Parameter Estimation and Inverse Problems, which was published by Elsevier in a third edition in November, 2018.

From 2009 to 2010 Aster presented U.S. seminars as part of the IRIS-SSA Distinguished Lecturership program.

In 2017 Aster was awarded the Distinguished Alumnus Award of the Department of Geoscience at the University of Wisconsin-Madison. In 2018 Aster was elected a Fellow of the Geological Society of America.  In 2020, Aster began a three-year term as chair of the IRIS Consortium board of directors. Aster was elected a Fellow of the American Geophysical Union in 2021 and a Fellow of the American Association for the Advancement of Science in 2022.

Publications

Books

Journal articles

References

External links
Publications
Abstracts
Colorado State University Faculty homepage
Earth and Environmental Science Department at New Mexico Tech
IRIS PASSCAL Instrument Center

American seismologists
University of Wisconsin–Madison alumni
University of California, San Diego alumni
New Mexico Institute of Mining and Technology faculty
Colorado State University faculty
1959 births
Living people
Fellows of the Geological Society of America
Fellows of the American Geophysical Union
Fellows of the American Association for the Advancement of Science